Eco Örebro was a Swedish professional basketball club in Örebro. They played in the Basketligan, the highest tier in Sweden, from the 2009–10 season.

On 12 May 2016 it was announced that the club was kicked out of Basketligan  and the club then decided to give up its activities for some financial reasons.

Season by season

Roster

References

External links
Eco Örebros Website 
Eurobasket.com team profile

Defunct basketball teams in Sweden
Sport in Örebro
2016 disestablishments in Sweden
Basketball teams disestablished in 2016
Basketball teams established in 2009
2009 establishments in Sweden